1915 in Argentine football saw the reunification of the Asociación Argentina de Football and the Federación Argentina de Football. Racing won its third consecutive league championship.

Rosario Central won the Copa Ibarguren, defeating Racing 3-1.

Argentina national team won the Copa Premier Honor Uruguayo and Copa Lipton.

Primera División
The reunification of the Asociación Argentina de Football and the Federación Argentina de Football brought the creation of a championship of 25 teams. The tournament took a league format with each team playing the others once. San Lorenzo de Almagro debuted at Primera División after promoting the last year, which caused all the "big five" to meet in a championship for the first time.

The top two teams finished even on points, which necessitated a championship playoff, which was won by Racing Club.

Asociación Argentina de Football - Copa Campeonato

Championship playoff

Racing Club de Avellaneda and San Isidro finished even on points at the top of the table, necessitating a championship playoff, where Racing won its third consecutive title.

Final

Lower divisions

Primera B
Champion: Gimnasia y Esgrima (LP)

Primera C
Champion: Martínez

Domestic cups

Copa de Honor Municipalidad de Buenos Aires
Champion: Racing Club

Final

Copa de Competencia Jockey Club
Champion: Porteño

Final

Copa Ibarguren
Champion: Rosario Central

Final

Playoff

International cups

Tie Cup
Champion:  Nacional

Final

Copa de Honor Cousenier
Champion:  Nacional

Final

Argentina national team

Titles
Copa Lipton 1915
Copa Premier Honor Uruguayo 1915

Results

References

 
Seasons in Argentine football